The 2007–08 National Premier League (known as the Wray & Nephew National Premier League for sponsorship purposes) was contested by the twelve teams in the top tier of association football in Jamaica. The league was split into a champions group and relegation group after 33 matches. Both groups then played five more matches within that group.

The Parish of St. James will be without a team in the 2008/09 NPL season for the first time in history.

The main sponsor of the league was terminated due to non-payment.

Final league table

Notes

National Premier League seasons
1
Jam